Sarisophora praecentrix is a moth in the family Lecithoceridae. It was described by Edward Meyrick in 1931. It is found on New Guinea.

References

Moths described in 1931
Sarisophora